Jonothan (Jono) Porter (12 May 1981 – 9 June 2004) was an Australian freestyle motocrosser.

Porter was a factory Suzuki Australia rider and formed his own motocross team and company, JPI Industries. In 1994 he won the Australian 80cc Australian MX Championship. In 2002, he won the Australian X Games and the Melbourne Supercross Masters, and the 2002 Planet X Games; in the last, he performed the first flip in Australian competition. 

On 9 June 2004, while leading the pack at the Maxxis Australian Motocross Champions in Coolum, he crashed and was run over by the riders behind him; he died shortly thereafter.

Sources

 Not forgotten - Jono Porter
 Motocross champ Porter dies after crash
 Gympie Times
 Jono Porter Memorial to begin its final lap
 Motocross idol Jono Porter remembered with memorial weekend
 Jono Porter remembered
 Gladstone ready to fly for Porter
 Jono Porter Memorial Motorcross Award in Engraved Stainless and Printed Acrylic
 Ready to ride at Jono Porter Memorial

External links
www.Fullnoise.com.au
www.mcnews.com.au

1981 births
2004 deaths
Accidental deaths in Queensland
Australian motorcycle racers
Motorcycle racers who died while racing
Sport deaths in Australia